Captain Underpants and the Invasion of the Incredibly Naughty Cafeteria Ladies from Outer Space (and the Subsequent Assault of the Equally Evil Lunchroom Zombie Nerds) is the third book of the Captain Underpants series by Dav Pilkey. The series of American children's books are about two fourth graders, George and Harold, and their mean principal Mr. Krupp, who can turn into Captain Underpants. It was published on September 1, 1999. It is the first book to feature the use of 'Extra-Strength Super Power Juice' (an invention of Zorx, Klax, and Jennifer, the antagonists of the book), which is used to give Captain Underpants superpowers later in the book. Its "annoyingly long title" becomes a running joke in the later books.

In September 2008 a collector's edition of the book was released. It features a 3D cover, and a CD of Captain Underpants-themed songs by Dav Pilkey's friend Koji Matsumoto.

Plot
Zorx, Klax and Jennifer, three evil extraterrestrials, suddenly land on the rooftop of Jerome Horwitz Elementary School, but people don't realize this unidentified flying object is on the roof of this school, and this allows them to spy on them. Meanwhile, George and Harold mess with this school's science teacher, learning about this action of mixing baking soda and vinegar. They then make the cafeteria ladies a fake cupcake recipe, disguised as "Mr. Krupp's Krispy Krupcakes" for Principal Krupp's "birthday". The lunch ladies decide to surprise Mr. Krupp and make cupcakes for the entire school and the school is flooded with sticky green goop.

A day after, as the school is cleaned, the lunch ladies show Mr. Krupp about the mess, who gets very mad when he hears that they did it for his birthday. ("But this was never my birthday!") Agitated, the lunch ladies blame George and Harold, but Mr. Krupp needs proof to punish them. Disappointed and pissed off from past agitations these two students did, these lunch ladies soon decide to resign. About 10 seconds after, these aliens invaders come, disguised as people and Mr. Krupp approves of them, despite having no previous similar efforts in cooking, with no credentials, or references at all. For George and Harold's antics, Mr. Krupp eliminates cafeteria privileges from both of them and requires them to eat lunch in his office where he can keep them, much to this surprise (believing they got in trouble for something they "didn't" do). The day after, while the three of them have lunch, both boys made unique sandwiches and other food so offensive, this makes Mr. Krupp sick making him exit his office to have some fresh air.

After Mr. Krupp leaves, George and Harold go to change letters on the sign in the cafeteria, only to realize this sign is already oddly arranged by the aliens. They immediately notice that all of the students and staff at the school have become evil zombie nerds. Sneaking into the lunchroom, George and Harold learn that the aliens fed the students and faculty "Zombie Nerd Milkshakes" and plan to feed them "Super Evil Rapid Growth Juice" the next day, turning them into giant minions bent on taking over the world. George and Harold steal the carton of growth juice and pour the contents out the window, most of which lands on a dandelion, turning it into the massive Dandelion of Doom. When they tell Mr. Krupp, he doesn't believe them but starts to believe them after Miss Anthrope (as a zombie nerd) bites a sizeable chunk out of his desk. When they enter the cafeteria, Zorx grabs Harold, who escapes and pulls off his gloves revealing his tentacles. Zorx snaps his tentacle at them (despite tentacles not having fingers), turning Mr. Krupp into Captain Underpants, who “runs to the shoe store to order a cheeseburger”, for what the “incredibly graphic violence chapter” said.

The boys temporarily defeat the aliens by Captain Underpants' return, but are spotted by the zombie nerds, causing them to climb up on the roof, where they run into the alien UFO to escape the Dandelion of Doom. Inside, they steal multiple cartoned juices, before the aliens lock them in their jail cell. The aliens take off in the spaceship and plan to shower the zombie nerds with "Super Evil Rapid Growth Juice" via the ship's spray gun. While the aliens gloat, the boys switch the labels of the growth and "Ultra Nasty self-destruct juices", along with those on the spray gun and fuel tank, setting off a chain reaction in the spaceship. The trio jump off the spaceship before it explodes using Captain Underpants' cape as a parachute. They end up landing in the mouth of the Dandelion of Doom, which begins to eat Captain Underpants. George reluctantly gives him some of the "Extra-Strength Super Power Juice", who fights and kills the dandelion with his new powers. Harold mixes the "Anti Evil Zombie-Nerd Juice" with root beer, which is fed to all the zombie nerds, transforming them back to normal. However, as a result of the Super Power Juice, Mr. Krupp (when Captain Underpants) permanently has superpowers.

Comics

Wedgie Wars Episode 1: The Phantom Principal
A parody of Star Wars: Episode I – The Phantom Menace, this book explains the events of the previous two books and how Captain Underpants and Mr. Krupp can change.

The Night of the Living Lunch Ladies
The Lunch Ladies are cleaning Friday's leftovers when the janitor locks them in the school, where they die by Sunday night. The janitor unknowingly buries them at a haunted hill. The Lunch Ladies rise from the dead and attack the gymnastics teacher. Captain Underpants came and tried to give them wedgies, but it proves ineffective "Oh no! Wedgie Power doesn't work on the living dead!" (Captain Underpants). They get into a big fight, and they all end up on a building. Captain Underpants uses the Toilet Paper of Justice to tie the ladies, but they break free with the help of steak sauce. Captain Underpants then swings to safety using the toilet paper to swing on, while the lunch ladies fall to their deaths when they try to follow.

Dog Man: The Wrath of Petey (Full-color version only) 
Dog Man was the best cop of the world, but he only had one weakness. He was eating out of the garbage cans, rolling in the dead fish and sniffing the other dogs. The cops (even the chief) decided to give him a bath, but Dog Man ran away because he doesn't like baths. The cops searched all around the city looking for Dog Man, but they couldn't find him anywhere. Soon, Petey decided that he should escape. He put the newspaper in the toilet, and he clogged the toilet by flushing the chain. The water from the toilet began going higher and higher and Petey escaped cat jail to his crime spree by robbing banks, stealing jewels and hijacking cars. But the cops could never catch them, they wish Dog Man would return. Meanwhile, Dog Man was hiding in an alley, eating out of a garbage can, and saw a newspaper. He felt ashamed, but he knew he must be brave and returned "bravishly" to stop Petey. He searched for him and picked up a trail which led straight to Petey's house, but it was a trap. Petey sprayed water and Dog Man got scared, so he ran away from Petey by digging a hole to the zoo. Dog Man came up in a cage where the skunks live, and the skunks sprayed on Dog Man. Dog Man "liked stinky stuff but that was too much"!  Petey ran out of the hole and got caught by a net. The cop sent Petey back to cat jail while the cops gave Dog Man a bath. Dog Man was now clean, but then he rolled on the dead fish again. This comic was both seen on the full-color version of the third Captain Underpants book in 2014 and Dog Man Unleashed in 2016.

Characters
 George Beard and Harold Hutchins - Two fourth grade pranksters in Jerome Horwitz Elementary School.
 Mr. Krupp - The mean principal of Jerome Horwitz Elementary School. In this book, he bans George and Harold from cafeteria privileges for pranking the old lunch ladies into creating a flood of green goop in the school. He sends the boys to eat in his office from that point onward.
 Captain Underpants - Mr. Krupp's alter ego.
 Zorx, Klax and Jennifer - Three mean aliens who disguise as school lunch ladies and turn the entire school personnel into zombie nerds, except for George, Harold, and Mr. Krupp.
 The lunch ladies - Three mean, gruesome lunch ladies of the Jerome Horwitz Elementary School cafeteria. George and Harold prank them into a birthday cupcake recipe, which turns into a wave of green goop flooding the school. Because they are fed up with the boys' pranks, they quit their jobs. In this book, all except one have a name - Mrs. DePoint and Ms. Creant.
 Mr. Fyde - The science teacher of Jerome Horwitz Elementary School.
 Ms. Ribble - The English teacher of Jerome Horwitz Elementary School, who turned into a zombie nerd.
 Mr. Meaner - The gym teacher of Jerome Horwitz Elementary School, who turned into a zombie nerd.
 Miss Anthrope - The school secretary of Jerome Horwitz Elementary School, who turned into a zombie nerd.
 Melvin Sneedly - George and Harold's nemesis, who received an unnamed cameo.
 The Deliriously Dangerous Death-Defying Dandelion of Doom - A dandelion that has consumed Super Evil Rapid Growth Juice, and the third key antagonist in the book.

See also

Captain Underpants and the Attack of the Talking Toilets
Captain Underpants and the Perilous Plot of Professor Poopypants

References

1999 American novels
Captain Underpants novels
Scholastic Corporation books